General elections were held in Rhodesia on 10 April 1970. They were the first elections to take place under the revised, republican constitution. The country had declared itself independent in November 1965, shortly after the previous elections; the Rhodesian Front government had always disliked the 1961 constitution and made sure to change it by the time of the next one.

Background
Following the referendum on the new constitution in June 1969, the timing of the next election was laid out: it would happen once the new Electoral Act had been put in place, and once delimitation of the new constituencies was complete.

This gave opponents of the Rhodesian Front a chance to organise in time for the election. At the Rhodesian Front congress on 23 October 1969, the party chairman Ralph Nilson warned the government to avoid complacency. The Centre Party had been founded in 1968 as a non-racial party which aimed for 'Middle of the Road' political opinion; it supported "advancement of the African on merit" and gradual abolition of racial discrimination and was led by Pat Bashford; it was strongest in the urban areas. Ian Smith described it as "the real opposition".

Robin James, an independent MP who had been expelled from the Rhodesian Front for opposing Ian Smith, formed the Conservative Alliance on 26 June 1969 which campaigned for the preservation of the white presence in Rhodesia. James attacked the Rhodesian Front for 'multiracial, integrationist policies'; his party was subsequently renamed the Republican Alliance. Eligible African voters also began to form political parties, among them the National People's Union which aimed to unite Africans against white supremacy without violence.

Electoral system
Under the 1969 constitution, the electorate of Rhodesia returned 66 members of the House of Assembly of Rhodesia. The electoral system was divided into three different classes of seat:

 European roll seats: 50 seats were returned by voters of European descent.
 African roll seats: 8 seats were returned by voters of African descent.
 Tribal seats: 8 seats were returned by Tribal electoral colleges made up of the Chiefs of the Tribes.

Qualification of voters
Qualification for being a voter depended on having sufficient means or educational achievement. All voters had to be a citizen of Rhodesia, over 21 years of age, have resided in the constituency for at least three months, and have an adequate knowledge of English and be able to sign the claim form in his or her own handwriting. There were then two rolls for which the voter might qualify, which were determined by their race.

To qualify for the European voters roll, a voter had to be European, Coloured, or Asian and either:

 Have received an income of not less than $1,800 per annum for the previous two years, or
 Own immovable property worth $3,600; or
 Having completed four years' secondary education of a prescribed standard, have an income of not less than $1,200 per annum for the previous two years, or
 Having completed four years' secondary education of a prescribed standard, own immovable property worth $2,400.

To qualify for the African voters roll, a voter had to be African and either:

 Have received an income of not less than $600 per annum for the previous two years, or
 Own immovable property worth $1,200; or
 Having completed two years' secondary education of a prescribed standard, have an income of not less than $400 per annum for the previous two years, or
 Having completed two years' secondary education of a prescribed standard, own immovable property worth $800.

In practice very few Africans qualified, and many who met the qualification requirements refused to register to vote.

Wives were deemed to meet the means qualification through their husbands' earnings or wealth, although for African voters living under a system of polygamy, only the first wife qualified. A Minister of Religion or a member of a religious order living under a vow of poverty was automatically deemed to have met the means qualification. Tribal chiefs also qualified automatically to vote.

Voters were disqualified if they were insane, had been convicted of a serious criminal offence or an offence under electoral law, had been under detention or restriction for more than six months under security legislation, or had been expelled from Parliament. Some voters were also disqualified for receiving Government rations or maintenance in lieu of rations for more than a year.

Constituency boundaries
A delimitation commission was established by the Electoral Act of 1969, and began work in December 1969. Several of the constituencies were the same as previous constituencies, but some changes were required due to population shifts. The delimitation commission had to work with electorate figures as of 1 February, and could recommend constituencies within 20% either side of a target electorate of 1,740 (which gave a maximum of 2,088 and a minimum of 1,393).

Campaign
On 1 March, Clifford Dupont as 'Officer Administering the Government' signed a proclamation dissolving Parliament and bringing into effect the new constitution at midnight (Rhodesia therefore became a unilaterally-proclaimed Republic on 2 March). The general election was set for 10 April.

The Centre Party announced on 4 March its intention to run 12 candidates. The party declared it accepted the constitution and therefore the independence of Rhodesia. It eventually ran 16; the Republican Alliance had 14, and there were 14 Independents. These candidates generally fell into two categories.

 The first category comprised candidates who were usually former members of the Rhodesian Front who had fallen out with it over the new constitution or some other issue. Max Cohen (Greendale) had resigned from the Rhodesian Front immediately before the election; Mrs Ina Bursey (Sinoia-Umvukwes) asserted that she was "sticking to the 1962 principles" of the Rhodesian Front; and William Ogley (Que Que) informed voters that he was now more conservative than the RF, just as Arthur Hubbard (Milton Park) said he was now to the right of it.
 The second category were those fighting rural constituencies in the interests of the farmer. Thomas Edridge (Marandellas) declared he wanted to restore profit to farming. Harry Affleck (Gwebi) and Roy Ashburner (Sinoia-Umvukwes) stood explicitly as farmers' representatives.

A victory for the Rhodesian Front was regarded as inevitable. Ian Smith, helped by the presence of the Republican Alliance, portrayed his government as not being racialist, and sought to postpone the question of what to do about the farming industry until after the election. In the event, the Rhodesian Front won every seat; the most marginal was Salisbury City, which included the large Salisbury community of Indian shopkeepers, and where a mixed-race candidate was only 40 votes off winning. The Centre Party's appeal to non-racial politics played well only among African voters who gave them seven out of the eight seats, with only one going to the National People's Union.

Results

European roll seats

African roll seats

Tribal seats
All the successful tribal MPs formed the Rhodesia Electoral Union on election.

 Note: In the Lowveld electoral college, Ranches Makaya was declared elected after drawing lots, having tied with Chikati Makamure.

Changes during the Assembly

Party changes
Allan Savory resigned from the Rhodesian Front in 1972 over the issue of land nationalisation. On 31 October 1972, he formed the Rhodesia Party together with Roy Ashburner (who had been an independent candidate in 1970), and Dr Morris Hirsch, who had been a United Federal Party MP in the 1960s.

Mabelreign
Patrick Palmer-Owen died on 9 June 1971. He was to undergo the first open-heart surgery of its kind at the time, but the operation was unsuccessful. A by-election was held to replace him on 5 August 1971.

Salisbury Central
Theo Ellison was convicted of a tax fraud and resigned from the Assembly on 15 November 1971. Nomination day for the byelection was 3 December 1971; only Hilary Gwyn Squires of the Rhodesian Front was nominated, and he was declared elected unopposed.

Kunyasi
Josiah Gondo died on 27 October 1972, leading to a byelection to replace him on 8 December 1972. Thomas Tavagwisa Zawaira was elected. There were five defeated candidates: Elias Mapiye Badza, Johnson Matariro Hungwe, Percy Hudson Mkudu, Samson Mundondo, and Isaac Hanzi Samuriwo.

Victoria
George Hartley was made Speaker of the House of Assembly on 27 March 1973, which made him a member of the House ex officio. A byelection to replace him was held on 17 May 1973.

Matojeni
Wening Moraka died on 7 March 1973 and a byelection was held to replace him on 24 May 1973.

Sinoia-Umvukwes
Frederick Alexander died on 26 December 1973, and the byelection to replace him was held on 28 February 1974.

Raylton
Thomas Pinchen resigned from the Assembly on 9 January 1974. The byelection in Raylton was held on 28 February 1974.

Sources
 Electoral Act of 1969 (no. 56), Statute Law of Rhodesia.
 Peter Bridger, "Encyclopaedia Rhodesia" (College Press Pvt. Ltd, Salisbury, Rhodesia, 1973).
 Rhodesia Herald
 Sunday Mail
 Report of the Delimitation Commission, 1970

References

Elections in Rhodesia
Rhodesia
Election
April 1970 events in Africa
Rhodesia
Election and referendum articles with incomplete results